Holdenhurst is a small isolated village situated in the green belt land of the north-east suburbs of Bournemouth, England. The village comprises fewer than 30 dwellings, two farms and the parish church. There are no shops and few local facilities in the village.

The village has only been accessible by car via a single narrow lane since the through route was cut off in the late 1960s by the building of the Bournemouth Spur Road (A338). There is no public transport.

Although the village itself has always been small, the civil parish at one time included the greater part of what is now Bournemouth. The civil parish was subsumed into Bournemouth County Borough in 1931, but a new civil parish called Holdenhurst Village was created on 1 April 2013. However, the ecclesiastical parish still exists; it encompasses Hurn, East Parley and Bournemouth International Airport, as well as the Townsend and adjacent areas of Bournemouth.

Etymology
Holdenhurst is recorded in the Domesday Book as Holeest suggesting an etymology of Old English holegn meaning "holly" and hyrst meaning "grove, wood", giving a meaning of "wood where holly (Ilex aquifolium) grows". In succeeding centuries it was spelt Holeherst (12th century), Holhurst (13th century), Hollehurst (14th century), Holnehurst (15th century), Holnest (16th century) and Holnirst (17th century).

Early history
The location of Holdenhurst on the edge of the flood plain of the lower Stour valley made it an ideal location for early farmers. There have been a large number of archaeological finds in the area including coins of the Durotriges tribe of Celtic Britain, and Roman coins have also been discovered making it likely that the Romans also settled in the area.

The hundred of Holdenhurst existed in 1176, but was soon extended and became known as the hundred of Christchurch; with that part west of the Stour (the original hundred of Holdenhurst) being known as the district of West Stour, or Westover. By 1263, however, the hundred of Christchurch with Westover had again become known as the hundred of Holdenhurst.

19th and 20th centuries
Although there were many boundary and name changes over the years, even by the start of the 19th century the parish of Holdenhurst (also known as the Liberty of West Stour) encompassed the whole area between Christchurch in the east and Poole in the west. The area was still a remote and barren heathland, and much of it was common land used by the inhabitants for livestock and by the poor for wood and turves.

In 1802, however, the Christchurch Inclosure Act, entitled An Act for dividing, allotting and inclosing certain Commonable Lands and Waste Grounds within the Parish or Chapelry of Holdenhurst in the County of Southampton was passed in Parliament. Commissioners were appointed to divide up the land and allot it according to an individual's entitlement, and to set out the roads and to sell plots of land in order to pay for their work.

In 1870-72, John Marius Wilson's Imperial Gazetteer of England and Wales described Holdenhurst like this:

Up until 1894 the parish comprised . In that year part of it was formed into a separate parish of Winton, and that part lying on the coast was transferred to the new parish of Bournemouth.

In 1931, the whole of the remaining part of the parish was subsumed into the County Borough of Bournemouth, later to be transferred from the county of Hampshire to Dorset, and in 1997 to become a unitary authority.

Politics 
Holdenhurst is part of the Muscliff and Strouden Park ward for elections to Bournemouth, Christchurch and Poole Council which elect three councillors.

Holdenhurst is part of the Bournemouth East parliamentary constituency, for elections to the House of Commons of the United Kingdom.

References

External links

 http://www.holdenhurstvillage.co.uk/
 https://web.archive.org/web/20080119221409/http://www.ruttergadd.co.uk/westover/

Villages in Dorset
Geography of Bournemouth
Civil parishes in Dorset
Conservation areas in Dorset